The following is a list of hospitals in Nigeria.

 Etta Atlantic Memorial Hospital
 Lekfad Medical Centre
 UDUTH SOKOTO
 Regions Stroke and Neuroscience Hospital, Mgbirichi, Imo State
 Aminu Kano Teaching Hospital
 University of Benin Teaching Hospital
 University of Ilorin Teaching Hospital
University of Nigeria Teaching Hospital
 University College Hospital, Ibadan
 Jos University Teaching Hospital
 Ahmadiyya Hospital Newbussa
 General Hospital Ningi
 Federal Health Medical Center (FHMC)
 National Hospital, Abuja
 Abia State University Teaching Hospital, Aba
 Imo State University Teaching Hospital, Orlu
 Sir Yahaya Memorial Hospital Kebbi
 ECWA Hospital Egbe
 Federal Medical Center, Abeokuta
 Bingham University teaching hospital. Formerly Ecwa Evangel Hospital, Jos
 Olabisi Onabanjo University Teaching Hospital , Ogun
 Lagos University Teaching Hospital
 Lagos State University Teaching Hospital
 Federal Teaching Hospital, Ido Ekiti
St Edmund Eye Hospital Surulere Lagos
 Newlife Hospital Mubi, Adamawa State

Kano State
See: List of hospitals in Kano

Lagos State
See: List of hospitals in Lagos

Rivers State
See: List of hospitals in PH

List of teaching hospitals in Nigeria